Emile Christophe Mota Ndango (born 5 May 1956, Bukama, Democratic Republic of the Congo) is the former minister of Agriculture, livestock and fishery of the Democratic Republic of Congo. He is also the acting president of Regional Fisheries Commission of the Gulf of Guinea, COREP. He is also a member of the national parliament of the Democratic Republic of the Congo.  and the former chief of cabinet of the late president of the Congo, Laurent-Désiré Kabila. He was born on the 5 May 1956 in the Katanga province.

Career
Emile Mota is  a professor at the University of Lubumbashi (UNILU) in Haut-Katanga Province. He lectures in economics and project management, in the department of economics in the Katanga (formerly Shaba), and he was the former economic adviser of the president of Katanga provincial parliament Gabriel Kyungu wa Kumwanza.

In 2000, he was approached by the late president of the DRC Laurent-Désiré Kabila, and he was appointed chief of cabinet in charge of the economy. He witnessed the killing of the president on 16 January 2001 while he was working with him.

In 2011, he became a Member of the national Parliament in Kinshasa. He was elected in the 2011 election for a five-year term. He is advocating for sustainable development and recycling practices. While in Parliament, he initiated a law project on subcontracting in the Democratic republic of the congo. In 2015, he was nominated Minister of Agriculture, livestock and fishery.

References

http://www.radiookapi.net/2015/09/26/actualite/politique/rdc-reamenagement-technique-du-gouvernement-matata-ii
https://web.archive.org/web/20160909162819/http://corep-se.org/p.php?p=l&y=Word-of-the-President-in-Exercise&id=4&t=eng&hu=2#.VqnBvNLnVuA
https://web.archive.org/web/20120829222445/http://ceni.gouv.cd/display_depute.aspx?id_province=70
https://web.archive.org/web/20111224200045/http://www.ceni.gouv.cd/partipolitique.aspx?id_parti=370
https://www.anzuwbusiness.net/jai-propose-cest-au-gouvernement-de-lappliquer-emile-mota-initiateur-de-la-loi-sur-la-sous-traitance/

External links
Memoireonline.com
Google.co.za
Wsws.org

Living people
Democratic Republic of the Congo politicians
1956 births
21st-century Democratic Republic of the Congo people